La Niña en la Piedra (Nadie Te Ve) (The Girl On the Stone: No One Sees You) is a 2006 Mexican drama film, directed by Maryse Sistach. The film received three Ariel Awards nominations in 2007: Best Actor, Best Actress and Best Original Score.

Plot
Gabino (Gabino Rodríguez), a very dedicated and hardworking young high school student, he is infatuated with Maty (Sofía Espinosa) and tries to make her fall in love with him. After an incident in the school, where Gabino and his two friends are suspended for harassing Maty, she rejects him for the last time causing Gabino to plan a revenge against Maty.

Main cast
Gabino Rodríguez as Gabino
Sofía Espinosa as Maty
Ricardo Polanco as Delfino
Iyantú Fonseca as Fulgencio
Alejandro Calva as Fidel
Silverio Palacios as Amadeo
Ximena Ayala as Perla
Arcelia Ramírez as Alicia
Luis Gerardo Méndez as Joaquín

Awards

Ariel Awards
The Ariel Awards are awarded annually by the Mexican Academy of Film Arts and Sciences in Mexico. La Niña en la Piedra (Nadie Te Ve) received three nominations.

|-
|rowspan="3" scope="row"| 2007
|scope="row"| Gabino Rodríguez
|rowspan="1" scope="row"| Best Actor
| 
|-
|scope="row"| Sofía Espinosa
|rowspan="1" scope="row"| Best Actress
| 
|-
|scope="row"| Eduardo Gamboa
|rowspan="1" scope="row"| Best Original Score
| 
|-

External links

References

2006 films
2006 drama films
Mexican drama films
2000s Spanish-language films
2000s Mexican films